was a Japanese author and literary critic in Shōwa period Japan.

Early life 
Yoshida was born in Tokyo as the eldest son of future Prime Minister of Japan Shigeru Yoshida, who at the time was a Japanese diplomat in Rome. His mother Yukiko, a daughter of Count Makino Nobuaki, left Tokyo soon after Ken'ichi's birth to join her husband, so he was raised at the Makino household during the first few years of his life.  He started living with his parents at the age of six, when his father was posted to Qingdao, China.  Thereafter he lived in Paris, London, and Tianjin (where he studied at a school for British children) before moving back to Tokyo where he graduated from secondary school.  In October 1930 he enrolled at King's College, Cambridge, where he was interested in the works of William Shakespeare,  Charles Baudelaire, and Jules Laforgue. He became a student of Goldsworthy Dickinson, but dropped out and back to Tokyo in February 1931, on Dickinson's advice that in order to devote his life to literature he should live in Japan.  During the next few years he studied French at the Athénée Français in Kanda, Tokyo.

Literary career 
Yoshida’s début as a writer was in 1935 with a translation of Edgar Allan Poe's Memorandum (Oboegaki). Over the next several years, he translated a number of works of French literature into Japanese. His debut into literary criticism was an article on the works of Laforgue, published in Bungakukai in January 1939. In 1939, together with Nakamura Mitsuo and Yamamoto Kenkichi, Yoshida co-founded the literary magazine  (literally, "Critique(s)"), which published critiques of modern French and British authors.

He was drafted into the Imperial Japanese Navy in May 1945 and assigned to the naval infantry brigade at Yokosuka Naval District, but was never posted to combat. In April 1949, he became a part-time lecturer at the Kōkagakuin. He was a professor of literature at Chuo University from April 1963 to March 1969.

Yoshida's output was prolific in the early post-war period, with works ranging from translations of Charles Baudelaire and English literature, ranging from Shakespeare to fiction (including Lady Chatterley's Lover), with short stories and novels. He also published lighter works such as : this was titled by its publisher against his wishes, so he also published a private edition of the same work under the title . He also contributed a column to the Asahi Shimbun, in which he introduced English slang, such as “One for the road”, and “Hair of the dog” to the Japanese public.  Noted as an eccentric, Yoshida was often at odds with his politician father. On occasion, after an argument which had resulted in the termination of his financial stipend from his father, he would sit outside the International Press Club in Tokyo with an upturned hat and a sign reading “Prime Minister’s son – penniless” in hopes of generating enough embarrassment to his father that his offenses would be forgiven.

Yoshida lived in Kamakura, Kanagawa between 1946 and 1953 and maintained a long correspondence with various Kamakura literati, including Ishikawa Jun, Ōoka Shōhei, Kobayashi Hideo, Mishima Yukio, and Nakamura Mitsuo. He was awarded the Yomiuri Prize in 1957 and 1971 and the Noma Literary Prize in 1970.

Yoshida died in his home in Tokyo in 1977, shortly after returning from a trip to Europe, at 65; his grave is in the Kuboyama Reien cemetery in Yokohama.

References 
 Katō, Shūichi. A History of Japanese Literature. RoutledgeCurzon (1997)

Notes

1912 births
1977 deaths
Alumni of King's College, Cambridge
Children of prime ministers of Japan
Japanese literary critics
Japanese military personnel of World War II
People from Tokyo
20th-century Japanese novelists
20th-century Japanese translators
Yomiuri Prize winners